Sigrid Goethals (born March 23, 1968) is a Belgian politician affiliated to the N-VA party.

Goethals studied pharmacy at the Vrije Universiteit Brussel and worked as a pharmacist before setting up her own practice in Ganshoren. She has described what she regards as the poor governance in Brussels and disputes between bilingual communities in the Brussels region as motivating her involvement in politics. She was elected as a municipal councilor for the N-VA in Asse in 2012 where she became an alderman. In the 2019 Belgian federal election, she stood for the Member of the Chamber of Representatives on the Flemish Brabant list but was unsuccessful at getting elected. However, in 2020 she was appointed to the Chamber to replace Jan Spooren who was ahead of her on the list.

References

1968 births
Living people
Members of the Chamber of Representatives (Belgium)
New Flemish Alliance politicians
Vrije Universiteit Brussel alumni
21st-century Belgian politicians
21st-century Belgian women politicians